Julie and Carol at Lincoln Center is a 1971 American television special featuring Julie Andrews and Carol Burnett, their second out of three specials after Julie and Carol at Carnegie Hall (1962) and before Julie & Carol: Together Again (1989). Held at the Philharmonic Hall at Lincoln Center in New York City, it was produced by Joe Hamilton, and written by Bob Ellison, Marty Farrell and Mitzi Welch, who reused the template from the first show.

Setlist 

As with the previous concert, the two comedian singers performed a medley; this one 14 minutes long and celebrating music of the 60's.

Critical reception and analysis 

The official website of Carnegie Hall asserted that this reprise of the Carnegie Hall concert confirmed that Julie and Carol had achieved a level of fame, success, and double-act after their 1962 show. Playbill lamented that this show tried to mimic its predecessor. Denton Record-Chronicle deemed the special "renowned".

The show was nominated for the 1972 Emmy for Outstanding Single Program – Variety or Musical – Variety and Popular Music.

References 

1971 television specials
1970s American television specials
Music television specials
CBS television specials
Carol Burnett